The New Year Honours 1916 were appointments by King George V to various orders and honours to reward and highlight good works by members of the British Empire. They were announced on 1 January 1916.

A number of the honours were gazetted as being in recognition of the services of officers during the War. These are noted with a # below.

Order of the Garter

The Right Honourable George Nathaniel, Earl Curzon of Kedleston, G.C.S.I., G.C.I.E.
Right Honourable Victor Christian William, Duke of Devonshire, G.C.V.O.

Victoria Cross 
Squadron-Commander Richard Bell Davies, D.S.O., R.N.  #

Order of the Bath

Knight Grand Cross (GCB)
Civil Division
The Right Hon. Sir George Houstoun Reid, G.C.M.G.
Sir Robert Chalmers, K.C.B.

Knight Commander (KCB)
Military Division
Vice-Admiral Edward Eden Bradford, C.V.O.  #
Vice-Admiral Herbert Goodenough King-Hall, C.V.O., C.B., D.S.O.  #
Acting Vice-Admiral Charles Edward Madden, C.V.O.  #
Rear-Admiral Rosslyn Erskine Wemyss, C.M.G., M.V.O.  #
Acting Vice-Admiral The Honourable Somerset Arthur Gough-Calthorpe, C.B.  #
Acting Vice-Admiral John Michael de Robeck.  #
Rear-Admiral Dudley Rawson Stratford De Chair, C.B., M.V.O.  #
Acting Vice-Admiral Henry Francis Oliver, C.B., M.V.O.  #
Vice-Admiral Reginald Hugh Spencer Bacon, C.V.O., D.S.O., retired.  #
Temporary Major-General Archibald Paris, C.B., R.M.A.  #
Lieutenant-General Sir Percy Henry Noel Lake, K.C.M.G., C.B., Colonel, The East Lancashire Regiment, Chief of the General Staff, India.
Major-General Arthur Phayre, C.B., Indian Army, Commanding Secunderabad Division.
Major-General Fenton John Aylmer, V.C., C.B., Adjutant-General in India.

Civil Division
Colonel Henry Capel Lofft Holden, C.B., Assistant Director of Supplies and Transport, War Office.
Ernley Robertson Hay Blackwell, Esq., C.B., Assistant Under Secretary, Home Office.
Lionel Earle, Esq., C.B., C.M.G., Secretary, H.M. Office of Works.
Noel Thomas Kershaw, Esq., C.B., Assistant Secretary, Local Government Board.
Frederick Francis Liddell, Esq., C.B., Second Parliamentary Counsel, The Treasury.

Companion (CB)
Military Division
Rear-Admiral Stuart Nicholson, M.V.O.  #
Captain Herbert Arthur Stevenson Fyler, R.N.  #
Captain George Price Webley Hope, R.N.  #
Commodore Algernon Walker Heneage, M.V.O., R.N.  #
Captain the Honourable Algernon Douglas Edward Harry Boyle, M.V.O., R.N.  #
Captain Hughes Campbell Lockyer, R.N.  #
Captain Lionel George Preston, R.N.  #
Engineer Captain William Whittingham, R.N.  #
Engineer Captain Henry Humphreys, R.N.  #
Engineer Commander George Edward Andrew, R.N.  #
Fleet Surgeon Arthur Gaskell, R.N.  #
Fleet Paymaster Hamnet Holditch Share, R.N.  #
Captain Charles Alfred Bartlett, R.N.R., R.D.  #
Colonel (temporary Brigadier-General) John MacNeill Walter, D.S.O., Deputy Adjutant-General, Headquarters, India.
Colonel (temporary Brigadier-General) Francis John Fowler, D.S.O., Indian Army, Commanding Derajat Brigade.
Colonel (temporary Brigadier-General) Alexander Henry Eustace, D.S.O., Indian Army, Commanding Kohat Brigade.
Colonel (temporary Brigadier-General) Wyndham Charles Knight, D.S.O., A.D.C., Indian Army, Commanding Bombay Brigade.
Colonel (temporary Brigadier-General) Frederick Hopewell Peterson, D.S.O., Indian Army, Commanding Jhelum Brigade.
Colonel Francis Herbert Sullivan Thomas, Indian Army.
Colonel Arthur William Cripps, Indian Army, Assistant Director of Supplies and Transport, Lahore Division.
Colonel (temporary Brigadier-General) Charles Edward Hendley, Indian Army.
Colonel Edward Hearle Cole, Indian Army.
Brevet Colonel William Westropp White, Indian Medical Service.

Civil Division
Rear-Admiral Arthur William Waymouth.  #
Rear-Admiral Morgan Singer.  #
Captain Laurence Eliot Power, M.V.O., R.N.  #
Captain Clement Greatorex, M.V.O., R.N.  #
Lieutenant-Colonel Herbert Edward Blumberg, R.M.L.I.  #
Engineer Rear-Admiral William Henry Riley.  #
Surgeon-General William Henry Norman, R.N.  #
Temporary Surgeon-General Humphry Davy Rolleston, M.D., F.R.C.P., R.N.  #
Honorary Captain Sir Richard Henry Williams-Bulkeley, Bart., R.N.R.  #
Lieutenant-Colonel Charles Orby Shipley, Commanding 3rd Battalion, East Surrey Regiment.
Lieutenant-Colonel Francis Henry Launcelot Errington, Commanding Inns of Court Officers Training Corps.
Honorary Brigadier-General Horatio Reginald Mends (Retired Pay), Secretary, West Riding of York Territorial Force Association.
Major-General John Wallace Carson, Canadian Local Forces.  #
Honorary Brigadier-General Frank Robert Crofton Carleton (Retired Pay), Director of Organisation, War Office.  #
Colonel Willoughby Garnons Gwatkin, Canadian Local Forces.  #
Colonel Charles Philip Martel, Superintendent, Royal Gun and Carriage Factories, Royal Arsenal.  #
Lieutenant-Colonel (temporary Colonel) Lionel Charles Gostling Tufnell, Officer in Charge of Records and Commanding Army Ordnance Corps.  #
Lieutenant-Colonel Charles Edward Phipps, Royal Garrison Artillery Inspection Staff, Royal Arsenal.  #
Montagu Sherard Dawes Butler, Esq., lately Joint Secretary on the Indian Public Services Commission.
Albert Gray, Esq., K.C., Counsel to the Chairman of Committees, House of Lords.
Sidney West Harris, Esq., Assistant Secretary, Home Office.
George Macdonald, Esq., Assistant Secretary, Scotch Education Department.
Henry Gascoyne Maurice, Esq., Assistant Secretary, Board of Agriculture and Fisheries.
Walter Frederick Nicholson, Esq., Clerk, The Admiralty.
Garnham Roper, Esq., Assistant Board of Trade.
Robert Fitzwilliam Starkie, Esq., Magistrate, Ireland.
Percy Thompson, Esq., Secretary to the Board of Inland Revenue.
John Anthony Cecil Tilley, Esq., Chief Clerk, Foreign Office.
Justin Theodore La Brooy, Esq., Civil Assistant to the Chief Superintendent, Royal Ordnance Factories.  #
Arthur William James MacFadden, Esq., M.B., Chief Inspector of Foods, Local Government Board.  #

Order of Merit

Henry James, Esq.

Order of the Star of India

Knight Grand Commander (GCSI)
His Excellency General Sir Beauchamp Duff, G.C.B., K.C.S.I., K.C.V.O., C.I.E., A.D.C. General, Commander-in-Chief of His Majesty's Forces in India.

Knight Commander (KCSI)
Sir Steyning William Edgerley, K.C.V.O., C.I.E., Member of the Council of India.
Harrington Verney Lovett, Esq., C.S.I., Indian Civil Service, Commissioner of the Lucknow Division, United Provinces, and a Member of the Council of the Lieutenant-Governor for making Laws and Regulations.
Robert Woodburn Gillan, Esq., C.S.I., Indian Civil Service, President of the Railway Board.
Maharaj Sri Bhairon Singh Bahadur, C.S.I., Vice-President and Political Member of the State Council, Bikaner, Rajputana.

Companion (CSI)
Henry Sharp, Esq., C.I.E., Indian Educational Service, Officiating Secretary to the Government of India in the Education Department, and an Additional Member of the Council of the Governor-General for making Laws and Regulations.
Ludovic Charles Porter, Esq., C.I.E., Indian Civil Service, lately Secretary to the Government of India in the Education Department.
Robert Russell Scott, Esq., Principal Clerk, The Admiralty, late Joint Secretary, Indian Public Services Commission.
Lieutenant-Colonel John Walter Edward, Baron Montagu of Beaulieu, V.D., Commandant, 2/7 Hampshire Regiment.  #

Order of Saint Michael and Saint George

Knight Grand Cross (GCMG)
Lieutenant-General Sir Herbert Scott Gould Miles, G.C.B., C.V.O., Governor and Commander-in-Chief of the City and Garrison of Gibraltar.
His Highness, Ibrahim, Sultan of the State and Territory of Johore, K.C.M.G. (Honorary)

Knight Commander (KCMG)
Sir Edward Marsh Merewether, K.C.V.O., C.M.G., Governor and Commander-in-Chief of the Colony of Sierra Leone.
William Lamond Allardyce, Esq., C.M.G., Governor and Commander-in-Chief of the Bahama Islands.
The Honourable William Thomas White, Minister of Finance of the Dominion of Canada.
The Honourable Thomas Mackenzie, High Commissioner for New Zealand in the United Kingdom.
The Honourable Sir Charles Kinnaird Mackellar, Knt., Member of the Legislative Council of the State of New South Wales, and lately President of the State Children's Relief Board.
Collingwood Schreiber, Esq., C.M.G., General Consulting Engineer to the Government of the Dominion of Canada.
Esme William Howard, Esq., C.V.O., C.M.G., His Majesty's Envoy Extraordinary and Minister Plenipotentiary to His Majesty the King of Sweden.
The Honourable Lancelot Douglas Carnegie, M.V.O., His Majesty's Envoy Extraordinary and Minister Plenipotentiary to the Portuguese Republic.
William Edwin Brunyate, Esq., C.M.G., Legal Counsellor to the Egyptian Government.
Sheikh Said Ali el Morghani, C.M.G. (Honorary)
Vice-Admiral Frederic Edward Errington Brock, C.B.  #
Vice-Admiral Sackville Hamilton Carden.  #
Vice-Admiral Sir George Edwin Patey, K.C.V.O.  #
Vice-Admiral Arthur Henry Limpus, C.B.  #
Rear-Admiral Cecil Fiennes Thursby, C.M.G.  #
Surgeon-General Sir James Porter, R.N., LL.D., M.D., K.C.B., Honorary Physician to the King.  #
Temporary Surgeon-General Sir William Watson Cheyne, Bart., R.N., M.B., C.B., Honorary Surgeon-in-Ordinary to the King.  #

Companion (CMG)
Thomas Alexander Vans Best, Esq., Colonial Secretary of the Leeward Islands.
Thomas Inglis Binnie, Esq., Director of Public Works, Nyasaland Protectorate.
James Rufus Boose, Esq., Travelling Commissioner, Royal Colonial Institute.
William Brymner, Esq., President of the Royal Canadian Academy of Arts.
John Cadman, Esq., D.Sc., Professor of Mining in the University of Birmingham; Petroleum Adviser to the Colonial Office, and Coal Mining Adviser to the Government of Nigeria.
Lieutenant-Colonel Henry James Grasett, Chief Constable, Toronto.
The Honourable Victor Albert Nelson Hood, Private Secretary to the Governor of Victoria.
Surgeon-General Guy Carleton Jones, Director of Medical Services; Canadian Expeditionary Force.
Brigadier-General James Charles MacDougall, Commanding Canadian Training Division; Canadian Expeditionary Force.
John Middleton, Esq., M.A., Colonial Secretary of the Colony of Mauritius.
Charles Frederick Wray Palliser, Esq., Secretary, Office of the High Commissioner for New Zealand.
Bernard Senior, Esq., I.S.O., Treasurer of the Island of Ceylon.
Adam Smith, Esq., Unofficial Member of the Legislative Council of the Colony of Trinidad and Tobago.
Brigadier-General Frederick Hugh Gordon Cunliffe. ("in connection with military operations in the Cameroons.")
Captain Guy Reginald Archer Gaunt, R.N., Naval Attache to His Majesty's Embassy at Washington.
Andrew Ryan, Esq., late First Dragoman at His Majesty's Embassy at Constantinople.
Thomas Harold Lyle, Esq., His Majesty's Consul-General at Bangkok.
Arthur Hyde Lay, Esq., His Majesty's Consul-General at Seoul.
Colonel William Hacche Drake, R.A., Adjutant-General for the Soudan.
Commodore Roger John Brownlow Keyes, C.B., M.V.O., Ad.C.  #
Captain Douglas Lionel Dent, R.N.  #
Commodore Maurice Swynfen Fitzmaurice.  #
Captain Wilfrid Nunn, R.N., D.S.O.  #
Acting Commander Leopold Arthur Bernays, R.N.  #
Temporary Major William Wellington Godfrey, Royal Marine Light Infantry.  #
Major Arthur Edward Bewes, Royal Marine Light Infantry.  #

Order of the Indian Empire

Knight Grand Commander (GCIE)
His Highness Maharaja Sir Ranbir Singh Bahadur, K.C.S.I., Chief of Jind, Punjab.

Knight Commander (KCIE)
Edward Vere Levinge, Esq., C.S.I., Indian Civil Service, an Ordinary Member of the Council of the Lieutenant-Governor of Bihar and Orissa.

Companion (CIE)
Major Cecil John Lyons Allanson, Indian Army, lately Military Secretary to His Excellency the Governor of Madras.
Rao Bahadur Chunilal Hari Lai Setalvad, Second Presidency Magistrate, Bombay.
John Andrew Turner, Esq., M.D., Executive Health Officer, Bombay Municipality.
Suresh Prosad Sarbadhikary, Esq., M.D., Calcutta.
John Norman Taylor, Esq., Public Works Department, Officiating Superintending Engineer, Irrigation Branch, Upper Jhelum Canal, Punjab.
Khan Bahadur Sardar Din Muhammad Khan, Laghari, late Acting Tumandar of the Laghari tribe in the Dera Ghazi Khan District, Punjab.
Lionel Linton Tomkins, Esq., Indian Police, Deputy Inspector-General of Police, Criminal Investigation Department, Punjab.
Douglas Marshall Straight, Esq., Indian Police, Inspector-General of Police, United Provinces, and a Member of the Council of the Lieutenant-Governor for making Laws and Regulations.
Babu Mot-i Chand, a Member of the Council of the Lieutenant-Governor for making Laws and Regulations.
Matthew Hunter, Esq., Indian Educational Service, Principal, Rangoon College.
John Tarlton Whitty, Esq., Indian Civil Service, Magistrate and Collector of Gaya, Bihar and Orissa.
Moses Mordecai Simeon Gubbay, Esq., Indian Civil Service, Deputy Secretary to the Government of India in the Finance Department, and lately Wheat Commissioner for India.
Lieutenant-Colonel Charles Augustus Muspratt-Williams, Royal Artillery, Chief Inspector of Explosives with the Government of India.
Raja Bhagwat Raj Bahadur Singh, of Sohawal, Central India.
Lieutenant-Colonel Robert Charles MacWatt, Indian Medical Service, Chief Medical Officer, Rajputana, and Civil Surgeon, Ajmer.
George Paris Dick, Esq., Government Advocate, Central Provinces.
Horatio Norman Bolton, Esq., Indian Civil Service, Deputy Commissioner, Peshawar District, North-West Frontier Province.
Major William John Keen, Indian Army, Political Agent, Dir, Swat and Chitral, North-West Frontier Province.
Major William Magill Kennedy, Indian Army, President of the Assam Labour Board.
Khan Bahadur Sheikh Makbul Hosain, United Provinces Provincial Service, Revenue Minister in the Kashmir State.
Colonel (temporary Brigadier-General) Cyril Harcourt Roe, Director of Movements and Quarterings, Quartermaster-General's Branch, Army Headquarters, India.  #
Colonel (temporary Brigadier-General) Offley Bohun Stovin Fairless Shore, C.B., D.S.O., Director of Staff Duties and Military Training, Army Headquarters, India.  #
Lieutenant-Colonel George Sim Ogg, Royal Artillery, Superintendent, Gun and Shell Factory, Cossipore.  #
Major Charles Hugh Hodges Nugent, Royal Engineers, Inspector of Machinery, Military Works Services, India.  #
Commander Michael Warren Farewell, Royal Indian Marine, Port Officer and Marine Transport Officer, Karachi.  #
Major John Bertram Cunliffe, Madras Artillery Volunteers.  #
Temporary Captain Evelyn Berkeley Howell, Special List, Censor of Indian Mails with the Indian Expeditionary Force in France.  #

Royal Victorian Order

Knight Grand Cross (GCVO)
The Honourable Sir Derek William George Keppel, K.C.V.O., C.M.G., C.I.E., Master of the Household to His Majesty.

Knight Commander (KCVO)
Richard Maximilian, Baron Acton, M.V.O., late Lord in Waiting to His Majesty.
Lieutenant-Colonel Sir James Robert Dunlop-Smith, K.C.S.I., C.I.E., Political Aide-de-Camp to the Secretary of State for India.
Surgeon-General Sir Anthony Alfred Bowlby, K.C.M.G., F.R.C.S., Surgeon in Ordinary to His Majesty.

Commander (CVO)
William Rose Smith, Esq., C.B., Clerk of the Council of the Duchy of Lancaster.

Member, 4th Class
John George Griffiths, Esq., Honorary Secretary, King Edward's Hospital Fund for London.
Staff Surgeon Robert Joseph Willan, R.N.V.R. (Dated 10 November 1915.)

Imperial Service Order (ISO)

Home Civil Service
John Hobson Aitken, Esq., Chief Clerk to the Government Office, Isle of Man.

King's Police Medal (KPM)

England and Wales
Police Forces
Captain Fullarton James, Chief Constable of Northumberland.
Captain Jasper G. Mayne, Chief Constable of East Suffolk.
Henry Riches, Chief Constable of Middlesbrough.
Captain Lindsay Robert Burnett, Chief Constable of the Wolverhampton Borough Police.
George William Bailey, Superintendent, Kingston-upon-Hull City Police.
James Bardwell, Superintendent and Deputy Chief Constable, West Suffolk Constabulary. 
John Clamp, Superintendent, Derby Borough Police.
John James, Superintendent and Deputy Chief Constable, Pembrokeshire Constabulary. 
John Foulger Page, Superintendent and Deputy Chief Constable, East Suffolk Police.
Young Sainsbury, Superintendent, Gloucestershire Constabulary.
Donald Waters, Superintendent, Metropolitan Police.
Albert Handley, Cecil Smithers, Sergeants, Metropolitan Police.
Walter Carpenter, John Dew, Fred Drabble, Albert Hughes, Charles Kemp, Constables, Metropolitan Police. 
Jack Monks, Constable, Blackpool Police.

Fire Brigades
William George Swanton, Deputy Superintendent, Newcastle-on-Tyne Fire Brigade. 
G. A. Henley, Fireman, London Fire Brigade.

Scotland
Police Forces
Charles Harding, Chief Constable of the Renfrewshire Constabulary.
James Ross, Superintendent and Deputy Chief Constable, Argyllshire Constabulary.
William Moodie, Superintendent, Edinburgh Police.
Archibald Swan, Inspector, Glasgow City Police.

Fire Brigades
William Waddell, Chief Officer of the Glasgow Fire Brigade.
William Allan, Superintendent, Edinburgh Fire Brigade.

Ireland
Albert Augustine Roberts, County Inspector, Royal Irish Constabulary.
Timothy Murphy, Head Constable, Royal Irish Constabulary.

India
Richard Howard Hitchcock, Superintendent, fifth grade, Madras Police.
Leslie Withinshaw, Acting Superintendent, Madras Police.
Lakshmaua Rao, Probationary Sub-Inspector, Madras Police.
Ellati Valiagatti Amu, Sub-Inspector, third grade, Madras Police.
John Moore, Superintendent, fourth grade, Madras Police.
Jack Elliott, Assistant Superintendent, second grade, Madras Police.
Tharmapuram Venkatarama Ayyar Krishnaswami Ayyar, 2nd class Inspector, Madras Police. 
Abhiramapuram K Rajah Ayyar. Deputy-Superintendent of Police, third grade, Madras Police.
Govindan Nayar, Head Constable, first grade, Madras Police.
Edmond Harvey Sullivan, Officiating District Superintendent, Madras Police.
Wilfred Henry Luck, Deputy Inspector-General of Police for Sind, Bombay Police. 
F. C. Griffith, Deputy Commissioner of Police, Criminal Investigation Department, Bombay City Police.
Simon Favel, Inspector of Police, Criminal Investigation Department, Bombay City Police.
Abdul Wahab Walad Shaik Fajee, First Grade Head Constable, G.I.P . Railway Police, Bombay Police.
Khan Saheb Muhammad Faizullah Muhammad Taki, Inspector, Criminal Investigation Department, Bombay Police.
J. Acton, Third Grade Inspector of Police, Ahmedabad, Bombay Police.
Dhondu Narayan, Constable, Bombay City Police.
Oswald Allen Harker, Deputy Commissioner, Bombay City Police.
John Joseph Stenson, Inspector, Bombay City Police.
William Thomas Moore, Deputy Inspector-General, Bengal Police.
Trevor Claude Simpson, Superintendent, Bengal Police.
Lionel Hewitt Colson, Superintendent, Bengal Police.
Keramat Husain, Head Constable, Bengal Police.
Elliot Kaye, Superintendent, United Provinces Police.
Bashir Husain, Sub-Inspector, United Provinces Police.
H. V. B. Scott, Superintendent, Punjab Police.
A. W. Mercer, Superintendent, Punjab Police. 
J. F . Coatman, Assistant Superintendent, Punjab Police.
Abdul Aziz, Inspector, Punjab Police
Sardar Liaqat Hayat Khan, Deputy Superintendent, Punjab Police.
Amir Ali, Inspector, Punjab Police.
Fazil Imam, Sub-Inspector, Criminal Investigation Department, Punjab Police.
Amar Singh, Sub-Inspector, Punjab Police. Sher Mohammad, Head Constable, No. 68 of the Dera Ghazi Khan District, Punjab Police.
Phuman Singh, Foot Constable, Punjab Police.
Edward Cheke Smalley Shuttleworth, Superintendent, Rangoon Town Police.
Nawab Ali, Head Constable, third grade, Burma Police.
Daim Khan, Head Constable, second grade, Burma Police.
Maung Mo Zwe, Head Constable, first grade, and officiating Sub-Inspector of Police, sixth grade, Burma Police.
Maung San Baw, Constable, Burma Police.
Sukraj Limbu, Subadar, Burma Military Police.
Maung Aung Ban, A.T.M., Deputy Superintendent, first grade, Burma Police.
Lieutenant-Colonel Albert Edward Woods, C.S.I., Inspector-General, Assam Police.
Hirarup Sahi, Jemadar, Lushai Hills Military Police Battalion, Assam Military Police. 
Muhammad Akbar, Officiating Sub-Inspector, fifth grade, North-West Frontier Police.
Khan Sahib Boi Khan, Subadar Major, Frontier Constabulary, North-West Frontier Police.
William Alfred Gayer, Deputy Inspector-General, His Highness the Nizam's Government, Hyderabad Police.
Subhan Khan, Constable, Ajmer-Merwara Police.
Abbas Raza Khan, Sub-Inspector, Baluchistan Police.
Gulab Shah, Mounted Head Constable, first grade, Baluchistan Police.
Sant Singh, Sub-Inspector, Punjab Police.

Colonial Forces
Andrew John O'Byrne, Constable, South African Police.
William Smith, Inspector of Police, Tasmania.
Percy John Ernest Grant, Sergeant of Police, Tasmania.
John Watson, Constable of Police, Tasmania.
U. M. Kalu Banda, Constable, Ceylon Police Force.
Mohamed Ali bin Nabi, Constable, Singapore Police Force.
Bela Singh, Constable, Federated Malay States Police Force.
Johnson Osuji Njemanze, Inspector, Police Force of the Southern Provinces, Nigeria. 
Samagi, Corporal No. 267, Police Force of the Southern Provinces, Nigeria.
Nyama, Lance-Corporal No. 346, Police Force of the Southern Provinces, Nigeria.

Distinguished Service Cross (DSC) 
Flight Sub-Lieutenant Gilbert Formby Smylie, R.N.  #
Lieutenant Humphrey John Lancaster, R.N. #
Lieutenant Robert Jardine Carruthers, R.N.V.R. #
Sub-Lieutenant Alexander Daniells, R.N.R. #
Sub-Lieutenant George Grimshaw Rose, R.N.R. #
Sub-Lieutenant William Quinn McKeown. #
Sub-Lieutenant Harry Beedle, R.N.R. #
Gunner (T) Arthur Samuel Edmund Roberts, R.N. #
Artificer-Engineer Arthur Lewis Shaw, R.N. #
Skipper Frederick Wink, R.N.R. #
Skipper Francis McPherson, R.N.R. #
Lieutenant Ralph Daniel Blyth Haddon, R.N. #
Lieutenant Arthur William Lancelot Brewill, R.N. #
Captain (now Major) George Leonard Raikes, R.M.A. #
Captain William Noel Stokes, R.M.A. #
Captain George Pinckard Lathbury, R.M.L.I. #
Temporary Captain Frank Summers, R.M. #
Acting Lieutenant Harold Roger Lambert, R.M.  #
Temporary Lieutenant Thomas Cuming, R.M.  #
Acting Lieutenant Francis Cecil Law, R.M. #
Midshipman Hugh Beckett Anderson, R.N. #

Distinguished Service Order (DSO)
Commander (Acting Captain) Richard Huth Walters, R.N.  #
Commander Edgar Robert Morant, R.N.  #
Lieutenant-Commander (Acting Commander) Walter Geoffrey Rigg, R.N.  #
Lieutenant-Commander (Acting Commander) Gervase William Heaton Heaton, R.N.  #
Engineer-Commander John Carmichael, R.N.R.  #
Lieutenant-Commander Norman Malet Colquhoun Thurstan, R.N.  #
Lieutenant William Victor Rice, R.N.  #
Captain Charles Penrose Rushton Coode, R.N. #
Commander Raymond Fitzmaurice, R.N. #
Commander Ralph Stuart Sneyd, R.N.#
Commander Robert Herbert Wilfrid Rhodes R.D., R.N.R. #
Lieutenant-Commander Kenneth Mervyn Bruce, R.N. #
Lieutenant Wilfrid Bayley Pirie, R.N. #
Captain Edwin Harold Barr, R.M.A. #
Temporary Captain Henry Meredith Leaf,. R.M.#
Flight Sub-Lieutenant James Brian Patrick Ferrand, R.N. #
Flight Sub-Lieutenant Taunton Elliott Viney, R.N. #
Le Lieutenant en second Colley Saint-Paul Comte de Sincay (Honorary)

Distinguished Service Medal (DSM)
Chief Petty Officer William Westborough, O.N.145272 (R.F.R. Dev. A/3287). #
Able Seaman Bezelell Jones, Mercantile Rating. #
Chief Engine-room Artificer, 1st Class, Albert Edgar Abraham, O.N.268771. #
Chief Petty Officer William Grant, O.N. 195507. #
Able Seaman George Broomfield, O.N. 237502.  #
Petty Officer Samuel Robert Saul Chamberlain, O.N.195022. #
Leading Seaman George William Tomsett, O.N.184462 (R.F.R. Ch.B/3055). #
Leading Seaman Walter Robert Francis, O.N.231988. #
Trimmer Christopher Pratt, R.N. Trawler Reserve, O.N.3680 T.S. #
Leading Stoker Andrew Martin, O.N.289335 (R.F.R. Po.B/3653). #
Engineman Frank Munro, R.N. Trawler Re- serve, O.N.3 E.S. #
Stoker Petty Officer Thomas H. Lawrence, O.N.K.1106. #
Yeoman of Signals Arthur Henry Hogbin, O.N.209010 (R.F.R. Ch.B/10824). #
Chief Petty Officer Arthur Frederick Hears, O.N.143768 (R.F.R. Ch.A/1862). #
Petty Officer, 1st Class, William Frederick Harris, O.N.119424 (R.F.R. Dev. A/2350). #
Deck Hand John Donaldson, R.N. Trawler Reserve, O.N.6544 D.A. #
Petty Officer, 1st Class, Charles Stuart Masters, O.N.178072 (R.F.R. Ch.B/5425). #
Engineman Alderman Cooper, R.N. Trawler Reserve, O.N.2760 E.S. #
Deck Hand Charles Henry Payee Drury, R.N. Trawler Reserve, O.N.649 D.A.  #
Stoker Petty Officer Henry Williams, O.N.309953. #
Chief Petty Officer Charles Matthew Cleveland, O.N.124057 (R.F.R. Ch.A/1510). #
Able Seaman Harry Elliott, O.N.229460. #
Boy Telegraphist Alex Bernard Keune, O.N.J30036. #
Seaman Christopher Kelly, R.N.R., O.N. 7806 A. #
Able Seaman James Tyrrel Turner, R.N.V.R., London, Z.470. #
Able Seaman Patrick Joseph' Welsh, Mercantile Rating. #
Petty Officer, 1st Class, Frederick Felix Lynch, O.N.149593 (R.F.R. Ch.B/5969). #
Second Hand Frederick Gibson, R.N. Trawler Reserve, O.N.76 D.A. #
Second Hand James Bell, R.N. Trawler Reserve, O.N.372 S.A. #
Deck Hand Frederick Hewitt, R.N. Trawler Reserve, O.N.1459 D.A. #
Deck Hand Alexander Gumming Thomson, R.N. Trawler Reserve, O.N.1460 D.A.  #
Deck Hand Roger Brown Martin, R.N. Trawler Reserve, O.N.1377 D.A. #
Deck Hand Arthur Burnard Mooney, R.N. Trawler Reserve, O.N.3184 D.A. #
Deck Hand James McAllister Burnett, R.N. Trawler Reserve, O.N.1215 D.A. #
Second Hand Joseph Foley, R.N. Trawler Reserve, O.N.80 D.A. #
Chief Armourer Telford Anthony, O.N. 342614. #
Chief Petty Officer Austin Jesse Emms, O.N.152170. #
Chief Electrical Artificer, 2nd Class, William Arthur Ellis, O.N.346013.  #
Petty Officer Abercrombie Blunden, O.N. 182407. #
Petty Officer Charles Fredrick Munds, O.N. 198331. #
Petty Officer Robert Almond White, O.N. 189413. #
Leading Seaman James Peter Travil, O.N. 215206. #
Chief Petty Officer Charles Herbert Porter, O.N.172059. #
Petty Officer William Joseph Brown, O.N. 160889. #
Chief Petty Officer Henry Edward Saunders, O.N.161556. #
Acting Chief Engine Room Artificer, 2nd Class, Robert Mills, O.N. 271072. #
Petty Officer Robert Moth, O.N. 220366. #
Chief Petty Officer William Henry Stamp,. O.N. 173,412.#
Petty Officer Daniel Garrett, O.N. 181,495. #
Able Seaman Edmund Charles Aslett, O.N. 236,458. #
Able Seaman Ernest Alfred Hobbs, O.N. 224,576. (R.F.R. Ch. B/8236.) #
Able Seaman Ernest Hall, O.N. SS.3771. #
Acting Serjeant-Major William Thomas Clarke, No. R.M.A. 6475. #
Gunner Robert McCurrach, No. R.M.A. 12045. #
Gunner Harry James Messum, No. R.M.A. 9579. (R.F.R. 1295.) #
Air Mechanic, 1st Class, George Thomas Oldfield. #
Leading Seaman William Norman, O.N. 184442. #
Petty Officer Thomas James Butland, O.N. 193117. #
Stoker Petty Officer William Coyte, O.N. 276228. #
Able Seaman Albert Victor Cornish, O.N. J.4508. #
Petty Officer Hugh McKenzie, O.N. 195365. #
Leading Seaman Samuel Peck, O.N. 208367. (R.F.R. Dev. B/4695.) #
Serjeant (Road Inspector) Alfred Chouffot, No. R.M.A./99(S), R.N.D., Motor Transport Company. #
Officier-marinier Francois Billois, pilote d'avion, Dunkerque Naval Aeroplane Squadron. #

Royal Red Cross (RRC)
Miss Margaret Clothilde Macdonald, Matron-in-Chief, Canadian Nursing Service.

References

New Year Honours
1916 in the United Kingdom
1916 awards